Inya Lake (ʔīnyā kǎn ; formerly, Lake Victoria) is the largest lake in Yangon, Burma (Myanmar), a popular recreational area for Yangonites, and a famous location for romance in popular culture. Located 6 miles (10 km) north of downtown Yangon, Inya Lake is bounded by Parami Road on the north, Pyay Road on the west, Inya Road on the southwest, University Avenue on the south, and Kaba Aye Pagoda Road on the east.

History

Inya Lake is an artificial lake created by the British as a water reservoir between 1882 and 1883 in order to provide a water supply to Yangon. The lake was formed by joining small hills that surrounded creeks which formed during the monsoon season. A series of pipes and cables distributes water from Inya Lake to Kandawgyi Lake near downtown Yangon.

The Second Far East Regional Scout Conference was hosted by the University of Rangoon in 1960, with the First Far East Professional Scouters Training Conference held at Inyale Camp on Inya Lake as an ancillary event.

On 16 March 1988, following the killing of two students during the pro-democracy demonstrations, students marching on Prome Road (now Pyay Road) were confronted near Inya Lake by the Lon Htein security force riot police and many beaten to death or drowned.

On 4 May 2009, the American citizen John William Yettaw trespassed upon the shoreline residence of Burmese political prisoner Aung San Suu Kyi, at the time under house arrest.  This was two weeks before her scheduled release on 27 May. They were both arrested after the incident.

Exclusive area

The area surrounding Inya Lake is one of the most exclusive neighborhoods in Yangon. Except for a public park on the southwestern bank by Yangon University, much of the shoreline is some of the most expensive private property in the country. Lakefront properties include residences of Aung San Suu Kyi, the late strongman Ne Win, and the United States ambassador.

Public access to the lake is available through Kaba Aye Pagoda Road, and most popularly, through Inya Road and Pyay Road, next to Yangon University. It takes about two hours to circle the lake on foot.

Inya Lake Park

Located next to Yangon University, the 37-acre (15-hectare) park is most well known as a romantic dating area for the university students, and is chronicled many times over in Burmese popular culture (novels, movies, songs, etc.)  Activities available to visitors include sailing and rowing. Yangon's premier sailing club is based on the lake.

References

Further reading
History of Rangoon, B. R. Pearn, American Baptist Missionary Press, 1939
Scouting 'Round the World, John S. Wilson, first edition, Blandford Press, 1959

External links

 
 Morning Mist over Inya Lake Flickr photos
 Inya Lake Embankment Garden Flickr photos

Lakes of Myanmar
Geography of Yangon
Scouting and Guiding in Myanmar
Tourist attractions in Yangon